The Gladiators: Galactic Circus Games is a 2002 real-time strategy video game.

Plot 
Major Greg D. Callahan of the United States Marine Corps gets shot through a black hole and ends up in an alien world where he must fight in gladiator-style fights in an arena, and help a character named Princess Lydia.

Gameplay 
Players play through three strategy campaigns without the complication of resource-gathering and city-building. The arena announcer gives the player goals which they must complete to succeed.

Critical reception 
Gamezone said the game would appeal to lovers of the Heavy Metal comic. IGN praised the game for offering mind-numbing fast-paced enjoyment. Andy Eddy of GameSpy said the game had a promising concept that fell apart in its execution. Bob Colayco of GameSpot wrote that the gaming experience was soured by issues regarding its difficulty, interface bugs, and save-game problems.

References

External links 
 Main Page

2002 video games
Real-time strategy video games
Video games about gladiatorial combat
Video games about the United States Marine Corps
Video games about time travel
Video games developed in France
Video games set on fictional planets
Windows games
Windows-only games
Tri Synergy games
Arxel Tribe games